Thomas George Vallance (23 April 1928, Guildford, New South Wales, Australia – 7 March 1993, Roseville, New South Wales) was an Australian geologist, specializing in petrology, and a historian of geology. The Geological Society of London awarded him the 1993 Sue Tyler Friedman Medal.

Biography
One of his ancestors was a schoolmaster who settled in Sydney in 1797. Thomas George Vallance grew up in Sutherland, New South Wales (NSW) and in 1945 matriculated at Sydney's Canterbury Boys' High School. He graduated from the University of Sydney (USYD) with a B.Sc. in 1950 and a Ph.D. in 1954. Under the influence of William Rowan Browne, he focused on geology, especially petrology. Vallance's Ph.D. thesis Studies in the metamorphic and plutonic geology of the Wantabadgery-Adelong-Tumbarumba district, NSW is based on research in central NSW and the region near Broken Hill. With Browne, he coauthored papers on the metamorphic petrology of the region near Cooma and on the geology of the region near Mount Kosciuszko. Vallance was a postdoc at the University of California, Berkeley from 1953 to 1954. In 1954 he was appointed the USYD's petrology lecturer, as the successor to Harold Rutledge (1920–1954), who died in the 1954 BOAC Lockheed Constellation crash. In 1954 Vallance visited the U.K. and met Victor and Joan Eyles, who inspired him to study the history of the geological sciences and to collect historical material, particularly related to the history of geological research in Australasia. At the University of Sydney, he was promoted in 1956 to senior lecturer. In May 1957 he married the geologist Hilary Brinton Krone in a ceremony at Sydney's Christ Church St Laurence. In 1961, supported by a Nuffield traveling fellowship, he visited the University of Cambridge and gave the inaugural Bennett Lecture in geology at the University of Leicester. At USYD he was promoted in 1965 to associate professor of petrology. For the academic year 1977–1978 he was a visiting professor of petrology at the University of Geneva. In 1989 at USYD, he retired as professor emeritus.

Vallance is best known for his research on metamorphic petrology. Perhaps his most important paper is his petrological study (1960) of spilites (altered basaltic rocks). This research contributed to understanding the mechanisms of hot water circulation through the oceanic basaltic crust. He continued his spilite search into the 1970s.

The Linnean Society of New South Wales elected him president in 1959, 1968, 1974, and 1988. He contributed thirteen articles on scientists to the Australian Dictionary of Biography. In 1967 he was a founding member of the International Commission on the History of Geological Sciences (INHIGEO). He wrote the chapter Foundation of the book Rocks, Fossils, Profs: Geological Sciences in the University of Sydney, 1866–1973.

Vallance compiled an extensive card index (with about 3,000 cards) of geologists, mining experts, surveyors, and prospectors, who either worked in Australia or on Australian geological materials. His card index was posthumously compiled and published as a CD-ROM. Upon his death his death in 1993, he was survived by his widow, a son, and a daughter. The Earth Sciences History Group of the Geological Society of Australia, with funding from his widow, established the Tom Vallance medal, awarded biennially in recognition of historians of Australian geology.

Selected publications

References

External links
 

1928 births
1993 deaths
20th-century Australian geologists
Historians of science
Petrologists
University of Sydney alumni
Academic staff of the University of Sydney